The Hollywood Bowl Orchestra (HBO) is a symphony orchestra which is managed by the Los Angeles Philharmonic Association and plays the vast majority of its performances at the Hollywood Bowl.

John Mauceri led the orchestra from its founding in 1990 until he stepped down after the 2006 Hollywood Bowl season.  During this time, his titles included Conductor, Principal Conductor, and finally, Director.  He now holds the title of Founding Director.

In March 2008, Thomas Wilkins was named Principal Guest Conductor of the orchestra for a two-year contract beginning in Summer of 2008.  The contract was extended multiple times until 2014 when Wilkins was promoted to Principal Conductor.

Musicians and cross-over with other orchestras 
The Hollywood Bowl Orchestra has 80-100 players drawn from the large pool of world-class freelance musicians in the Southern California area, many of whom perform regularly with movie studios, regional orchestras, and other entertainment-related organizations.

There is no cross-over between the Hollywood Bowl Orchestra musicians and the regular roster of the Los Angeles Philharmonic. This is in notable contrast to the Boston Pops Orchestra which draws its players directly from the Boston Symphony (i.e. the Boston Symphony without its principal players), or the Cincinnati Pops Orchestra which is simply the Cincinnati Symphony playing under a different name.

History 

Since 1922 orchestras performed regularly at the Bowl, primarily drawn from the Los Angeles area. In 1927 a "Hollywood Bowl Orchestra" was established under conductor Eugene Goossens. The orchestra made a series of recordings for Victor in 1928 issued as "Symphonies under the Stars" notable for being recorded in the open air.  Guest conductors of these events included Alfred Hertz, Ossip Gabrilowitsch, Bruno Walter, Pierre Monteux, Pietro Crimini, Modest Altschuler, Adolf Tandler, and Vladimir Shavitch (in addition to Goossens).

Stokowski's orchestra 
The first incarnation of a permanent orchestra was in 1945 as the "Hollywood Bowl Symphony Orchestra" under the direction of Leopold Stokowski.  They had a number of recordings under Stokowski plus others under different conductors, including:
 Music of George Gershwin with Felix Slatkin conducting and Leonard Pennario piano soloist
 Tchaikovsky's Piano Concerto No. 1 with Vladimir Horowitz as soloist and William Steinberg conducting
However, after only two seasons, the orchestra was disbanded, and all the summer orchestral concerts at the Hollywood Bowl were subsequently performed by the Los Angeles Philharmonic. However, another incarnation of the Hollywood Bowl Symphony Orchestra continued into the 1950s and '60s, led by such conductors as Slatkin, Miklós Rózsa, Carmen Dragon, and Alfred Newman, and made numerous recordings for Capitol Records.

Re-establishment in 1990 
On October 17, 1990, the management of the Los Angeles Philharmonic Association (LAPA) led by Ernest Fleischmann (LAPA Executive VP and Managing Director at the time) and John Mauceri, newly appointed Principal Conductor, held a press conference announcing the formation of a second orchestra under its auspices, this time titled "Hollywood Bowl Orchestra."  There were four primary reasons for its existence:
 Relieve the Los Angeles Philharmonic Orchestra some of its responsibilities of playing weekend concerts at the Hollywood Bowl during the summer.
 Reinvent the "pops" format.  During the announcement, both Fleischmann and Mauceri took great pains to avoid the term "pops" in relation to the orchestra and/or its repertoire.  Mauceri said, "This is something unique in our century, that there seems to be a division between music that is 'popular' and music that is 'serious.' This ensemble will cut across these artificial barriers to become an orchestra for all tastes."    The HBO would be dedicated to the preservation of American musical heritage from movies to musicals to the concert hall.
 Record this reinvented pops repertoire.  At the press conference, the orchestra announced that it had signed a 15-CD recording contract with Philips Classics; in fact, Fleischmann noted that the impetus for forming the orchestra began when Philips lost its recording contract with the Boston Pops to Sony Classical.
 Tour internationally, with the first tour set for Japan in December 1991.

Mauceri Years 
The first public performances by the orchestra were for Independence Day concerts on July 2–4, 1991 at the Hollywood Bowl with Mauceri conducting and Bruce Hubbard (baritone) as soloist.  The program included works by Aaron Copland, Leonard Bernstein, John Williams, George Gershwin, and Jerome Kern among others.  John Henken's concert review in the Los Angeles Times praised Mauceri for choosing "an Americana program that was nicely paced, reasonably varied and made musical as well as patriotic points.  More important still, he got his orchestra to project it all with exuberance and flair."

During Mauceri's tenure, he and the orchestra largely fulfilled the goals announced when the orchestra was founded.
 They performed a wide variety of repertoire, from Broadway musicals to traditional "classical" works including concert performances of full operas.  Mauceri frequently conducted classic and contemporary motion picture scores, and performed and recorded compositions for the concert hall by musicians traditionally known only as "film composers" such as Erich Wolfgang Korngold, Miklos Rozsa, Dimitri Tiomkin, and Alfred Newman.  He even re-introduced forgotten music, including the "Fanfare for the Hollywood Bowl" by Arnold Schoenberg.  He became known for speaking to the audience from the stage about the evening's performance in an easy-going, educational, and entertaining way.  And he began every concert by saying, "I'm John Mauceri.  And this is the Hollywood Bowl Orchestra."
 They made 13 recordings for Philips.  Among their recordings of their stated repertoire, most noteworthy is "The King and I," with Julie Andrews and Ben Kingsley in the lead roles, Lea Salonga, Peabo Bryson, and Marilyn Horne in supporting roles, and film stars Roger Moore and Martin Sheen in special cameo appearances.  This was the first recording in 35 years to use the original orchestrations of the Academy Award-winning movie version.  The recording was  No. 1 on the Billboard classical crossover chart in only its second week of release, and also received Billboard's 1993 Crossover CD of the Year award.
 They had a number of tours:  New Year's Eve concerts December 1991, 1993, 1995, and 1997 in Japan,  and November 1996 concerts in Brazil.

From among the Orchestra's more than 300 concerts, Kathleen Battle, Plácido Domingo, Jane Eaglen, Marilyn Horne, Alexander Frey, Jennifer Larmore, Sylvia McNair, Andrea Bocelli, Gil Shaham, Stephen Hough, Luciano Pavarotti and the San Francisco Ballet represent the illustrious talent from the worlds of opera, ballet and classical music that has graced the stage with the Orchestra. Trisha Yearwood, Garth Brooks (in his only performance with an orchestra) and the late John Denver brought to their performances the irrepressible optimism of Country-Western. Jason Alexander, Carol Burnett, Kristin Chenoweth, Kirk Douglas, Patti LuPone, Reba McEntire, Lynn Redgrave, Peabo Bryson, Harry Connick Jr., Alan Cumming, Davis Gaines, Savion Glover, Joel Grey, Garrison Keillor, Leonard Nimoy, Brian Stokes Mitchell and Patrick Stewart have brought their inimitable gifts to the Bowl stage. Hosting Big Bad Voodoo Daddy, Chicago, Cheap Trick, The Chieftains, Sergio Mendes, The Moody Blues, Pink Martini, Tito Puente and the Latin Jazz Ensemble, Royal Crown Revue, and Rufus Wainwright, the Orchestra has proven itself in the world of pop and rock. Rosemary Clooney, Natalie Cole, Ann Miller, Della Reese, Sir George Martin, and Peter, Paul & Mary are among artists with whom the Orchestra has been privileged to work. And, in the 1999 season, John Mauceri stepped aside to allow the mayor of Los Angeles, the Honorable Richard J. Riordan, to make his conducting debut at the Bowl with the Hollywood Bowl Orchestra.

References

External links 
 
 John Mauceri's bio on his webpage, with substantial portion on the Hollywood Bowl Orchestra 

Decca Records artists
Hollywood Bowl
Music of Los Angeles
American instrumental musical groups
Musical groups established in 1990
Orchestras based in California
Pops orchestras